Vidalia is a genus of tephritid  or fruit flies in the family Tephritidae. Vidalia are commonly found distributed from the Eastern Palearctic to Oriental and Australasian. They breed in the fruits of Schefflera subulata, a member of Araliaceace, in West Malaysia (Aluja, Martin, and Allen L. Norrbom. Fruit Flies (Tephritidae): Phylogeny and Evolution of Behavior. CRC Press, 2000).

Species
Vidalia accola (Hardy, 1973)
Vidalia armifrons (Portschinsky, 1891)
Vidalia bicolor Hardy, 1987
Vidalia bidens Hendel, 1915
Vidalia buloloae (Malloch, 1939)
Vidalia ceratophora Bezzi, 1913
Vidalia diffluata Hering, 1938
Vidalia dualis Permkam & Hancock, 1995
Vidalia duplicata (Han & Wang, 1994)
Vidalia eritima (Han & Wang, 1994)
Vidalia fletcheri Munro, 1938
Vidalia furialis Ito, 1984
Vidalia himalayensis (Bezzi, 1913)
Vidalia imbellis Ito, 2011
Vidalia impressifrons Robineau-Desvoidy, 1830
Vidalia kijanga Chua & Ooi, 1997
Vidalia langatensis Chua, 2000
Vidalia placabilis Ito, 2011
Vidalia spadix Chen, 1948
Vidalia thailandica Hancock & Drew, 1994
Vidalia tuberculata Hardy, 1970

References

Aluja, Martin, and Allen L. Norrbom. Fruit Flies (Tephritidae): Phylogeny and Evolution of Behavior. CRC Press, 2000.

Tephritidae genera
Trypetinae